The Carnegie Hall Concerts: December 1947 is a live album by American pianist, composer and bandleader Duke Ellington recorded at Carnegie Hall, in New York City in 1947 and released on the Prestige label in 1977.

Reception
The AllMusic review by Scott Yanow awarded the album 4½ stars and stated: "The judicious editing out of certain material provides a fresh set list, with little duplication from other live recordings and no overworked hits, making this a wonderful addition to anyone's Ellington collection".

Track listing
All compositions by Duke Ellington except as indicated
 "The New Look (Snibor)" (Billy Strayhorn) - 3:27  
 "Blue Serge" (Mercer Ellington) - 4:16  
 "Triple Play" - 5:39  
 "Harlem Air Shaft" - 3:10  
 "Johnny Hodges Medley: Wanderlust/Junior Hop/Jeep's Blues/Jeep Is Jumpin'/Squaty Roo/Mood To Be Woo'd" (Ellington, Johnny Hodges) - 6:15  
 "Mella Brava" - 3:44  
 "Kickapoo Joy Juice" - 3:37  
 "On a Turquoise Cloud" (Lawrence Brown, Ellington) - 3:33  
 "Bakiff" (Juan Tizol) - 5:54  
 "Cotton Tail" - 3:04  
 "Liberian Suite: I Like the Sunrise" - 4:50  
 "Liberian Suite: Dance No. 1" - 4:52  
 "Liberian Suite: Dance No. 2" - 4:09  
 "Liberian Suite: Dance No. 3" - 3:46  
 "Liberian Suite: Dance No. 4" - 4:13  
 "Liberian Suite: Dance No. 5" - 5:08  
 "Theme Medley: East St. Louis Toodle-Oo/Echoes of Harlem/Black and Tan Fantasy/Things Ain't What They Used to Be" - 6:29  
 "Basso Profundo" - 2:08  
 "New York City Blues" - 4:42  
 "The Clothed Woman" - 4:27  
 "Trumpet No End (Blue Skies)" (Irving Berlin) - 2:42

Personnel
Duke Ellington – piano
Shorty Baker, Shelton Hemphill, Al Killian, Francis Williams - trumpet
Ray Nance - trumpet, violin
Lawrence Brown - trombone
Tyree Glenn - trombone, vibraphone
Claude Jones - valve trombone
Russell Procope - alto saxophone, clarinet 
Johnny Hodges - alto saxophone
Jimmy Hamilton - clarinet, tenor saxophone
Al Sears - tenor saxophone
Harry Carney - baritone saxophone, clarinet, bass clarinet
Fred Guy - guitar
Oscar Pettiford, Junior Raglin - bass
Sonny Greer - drums
Kay Davis (track 8), Al Hibbler (track 11) - vocals

References

Duke Ellington live albums
1977 live albums
Live orchestral jazz albums
Prestige Records live albums
Albums recorded at Carnegie Hall